William Fellowes (c. 1726–1804) was an English politician.

Life
The son of Coulson Fellowes of Ramsey Abbey, Huntingdonshire, and his wife, Urania Herbert, William Fellowes matriculated at St John's College, Cambridge in 1744, aged 17.

Fellowes entered parliament in 1768 as member for : his mother's brother, Henry Herbert, 1st Earl of Powis, brought him in unopposed with his local interest. He generally supported the administrations of Augustus FitzRoy, 3rd Duke of Grafton and Lord North. He did not stand in the 1774 general election. He was High Sheriff of Cambridgeshire and Huntingdonshire in 1779.

He held the Andover seat until 1796, but is not recorded as speaking in the House of Commons, and had a meagre voting record.

Family
Fellowes married in 1768, Lavinia Smyth, daughter of James Smyth of St Audries in Somerset. They had three sons and two daughters. William Henry Fellowes was their eldest son. Edward Fellowes R.N. was another son.

Notes

1804 deaths
Members of the Parliament of Great Britain for English constituencies
Year of birth uncertain